The Drew ministry has governed Saint Kitts and Nevis since August 2022. It was formed by Prime Minister Terrance Drew after victory in the 2022 Saint Kitts and Nevis general election.

Ministers 
The government was sworn in on 15 August 2022.

 Geoffrey Hanley - Deputy Prime Minister
 Marsha Henderson - Minister of Tourism, Civil Aviation, and Urban Development
 Konris Maynard - Minister of public infrastructure and utilities, transport, information, communication and technology, and post
 Samal Duggins - Minister of agriculture, fisheries, creative economy, entrepreneurship, marine resources, and cooperatives
 Denzil Douglas - Minister of Foreign Affairs
 Garth Wilkin - attorney general and minister of justice and legal affairs
 Joelle Clarke will be responsible for sustainable development, climate action, constituency empowerment, and environment
 Isalean Philip was sworn in as a senator

References 

Current governments
Cabinets established in 2022
2022 establishments in North America
Politics of Saint Kitts and Nevis
Ministries of Elizabeth II
Ministries of Charles III